Muuksi is a village in Kuusalu Parish, Harju County in northern Estonia.

Architect Erika Nõva (1905–1987) was born in Toomani farmstead in Muuksi village.

Gallery

References

Villages in Harju County